Third Eye Blind is the debut studio album by American rock band Third Eye Blind, released on April 8, 1997, by Elektra Records. The album was collectively written by Stephan Jenkins and Kevin Cadogan, while production was helmed by Jenkins and Eric Valentine. Recorded in and around San Francisco at Toast Studios, Skywalker Ranch, and H.O.S., the album incorporates elements of alternative rock, post-grunge, and power pop. Thematically, the album focuses on topics such as relationships, drug addiction, suicide prevention, and the band's experience of being signed to a major record label. Third Eye Blind was promoted with five singles: "Semi-Charmed Life", "Graduate", "How's It Going to Be", "Losing a Whole Year", and "Jumper".

Music and lyrics
The central theme of Third Eye Blind is loss, with the album exploring subjects such as suicide, crystal methamphetamine addiction, and sexual abuse. "Semi-Charmed Life", an alternative rock song composed with a rap-influenced singing style, was one of the first songs recorded for the album. The song focuses on a crystal methamphetamine addiction, although Jenkins contends that it more broadly relates to changing periods in one's life.

Title and artwork
When developing a band name and a title for their debut record, Jenkins sought a name with "wit and a sense of punk-rock irony". The name "Third Eye Blind" is meant to refer to a metaphysical third eye, however, the band also intended to satirize the concept. Alli and Ro-Starr were responsible for the album's art direction, with the latter also crafting the band's "falling man" logo. Kate Garner was responsible for the album's photography, with the exclusion of the album cover which was shot by Christine Alicino on December 16, 1996, in San Francisco, California. The shot features model Shandra Boatwright, eyes closed with her mouth wide open, as her and Jenkins' hands are placed on her forehead. Alicino commented that she was hired to "photograph a young woman with an expressive mouth in my edgy polaroid style". In order to achieve this expressive appearance, Boatwright wore bright red lipstick and dark eyeliner.

The first pressing of Third Eye Blind in the United States featured a sepia-toned album cover with a red band logo. This pressing was limited to approximately 500,000 copies in the country, however, it was still employed in the United Kingdom and other European nations. The second pressing of the album featured these colors reverted, with a red-toned cover and yellow band logo. In Japan, the album was released with a cyan, negative photo cover. The 20th anniversary edition of the album features a black-toned version of the cover.

In April 2022, Jenkins stated on Twitter that the sepia-toned cover is "how [the artwork is] supposed to be," although the artwork was changed to a red-tone due to Elektra Records finding the latter to be "more flashy."

Documentary
In December 2019, a 22-minute documentary short film titled Motorcycle Drive By was announced on Third Eye Blind's Twitter page. The documentary is directed by David Wexler and focuses on the backstory of the song of same name. The documentary was originally planned to premiere on April 17, 2020, at the 19th Tribeca Film Festival, although the film festival was indefinitely postponed due to the COVID-19 pandemic. The documentary was then released on May 29, 2020, on YouTube as part of the We Are One: A Global Film Festival.

Touring
Third Eye Blind performed across the United States alongside Eve 6 on MTV's Campus Invasion tour. The band also performed as an opening act for The Rolling Stones and U2 on their respective tours.

Reception 

Critical reception to Third Eye Blind was generally positive. Stephen Thomas Erlewine of AllMusic described Third Eye Blind as "easy on the ears," stating that "its straight-ahead professionalism makes it a pleasurable listen for post-grungers". David Grad of Entertainment Weekly described the album as "balancing a cheery ear for harmonies with a finely honed sense of despair".

Third Eye Blind was a sleeper hit, entering the Billboard album charts at number 135 and then peaking at number 25 nearly a year after release. The album spent a total of 106 weeks on the chart, and was certified 6x platinum by the RIAA in August 2001. As of April 2017, Third Eye Blind has sold over 6 million units in the U.S., selling approximately 84,000 units in its best week. The album remains as Third Eye Blind's most successful release, accounting for the plurality of their career sales.

Legacy
In 2022, Avril Lavigne cited the album as one of the biggest influences in her music career.

Track listing

Standard edition

20th Anniversary edition

Personnel
Third Eye Blind
 Kevin Cadogan –  lead guitar ; backing vocals ; autoharp 
 Brad Hargreaves – drums 
 Stephan Jenkins – lead vocals ; percussion ; brushes ; guitar ; programming ; keyboard arrangements ; drums ; acoustic guitar 
 Arion Salazar – bass guitar ; backing vocals ; piano 

Additional musicians
 Michael Urbano – drums 
 Eric Valentine – programming ; piano ; guitar ; keyboards 
 Ari Gorman – cello 

Design
 Alli – art direction
 Ro-Starr – art direction, logos/design
 Christine Alicino – front cover photo
 Kate Garner – photography

Charts

Weekly charts

Year-end charts

Certifications and sales

Release history

References

External links
Audio for the album on YouTube

Third Eye Blind albums
1997 debut albums
Elektra Records albums
Albums produced by Eric Valentine